The men's marathon event  at the Friendship Games was held on 18 August 1984 in Moscow, Soviet Union, together with the annual Moscow International Peace Marathon. Apart from the elite runners, about 5000 amateurs took part.

Results

*Out of competition performance

See also
Athletics at the 1984 Summer Olympics – Men's marathon

References
 

Athletics at the Friendship Games
Friendship Games